Tully is a surname of Irish origin. The surname itself and its variants include Tally, MacTully, Tilly and Flood, all of which can derive from several different unrelated Irish families, such as Ó Maoltuile, Taithligh, Mac Maoltuile, Ó Taithligh, and Mac an Tuile. Some MacTullys changed their name to Flood as tuile is Irish for 'flood'.

Tully is also an anglicised form of the Irish word tulach or tulaigh, meaning 'hill' or 'mound', and is used in various Irish place names.

Persons with the surname
 Marcus Tullius Cicero, sometimes anglicized as Tully, Roman orator and statesman
 Alice Tully (1902–1993), American philanthropist
 B. Joseph Tully (1927–2015), American politician
 Charlie Tully (1924–1971), footballer from Belfast
 Colin Tully (born 1945), Australian rules footballer
 Craig Tully (born 1976), Scottish football coach
 Darrell Tully (1917–1997), American football player and coach
 Darrow Tully (1932–2010), American newspaper publisher
 E. C. Tully, member of the 1859–1860 California State Assembly
 Fred Tully (1907–1969), English footballer
 George Tully (disambiguation), several people
 Grace Tully (1900–1984), private secretary to U.S. President Franklin D. Roosevelt
 Henri de Tully (1798–1846), French librettist and playwright
 Jack Tully (1885–1966), Australian politician
 James Tully (disambiguation), several people
 Jim Tully (1886–1947), American writer
 Joan Tully (1907–1973), Australian agricultural scientist 
 John Tully (disambiguation), several people
 Kevin Tully (born 1952), English footballer
 Kivas Tully (1820–1905), American architect
 Laurie Tully (1917–1981), Australian politician
 Mark Tully (born 1935), British author and reporter
 Mary Rose Tully (1946–2010), American breastfeeding activist
 Michael J. Tully Jr. (1933–1997), New York politician
 Michael S. Tully (born 1967), Louisville Ky 
 Mike Tully (born 1956), American pole vaulter
 Montgomery Tully (1904–1988), Irish film director
 Nicole Tully (born 1986), American distance runner
 Patrick Tully, Gaelic footballer and coach
 Peter Tully (1947–1992), Australian artist
 Pinckney R. Tully (1824–1903), American businessman and politician
 Pleasant B. Tully (1829–1897), U.S. Representative from California
 R. Brent Tully (born 1943), American astronomer
 Richard Walton Tully (1877–1945), American playwright
 Robert Tully, American football coach
 Roger Tully (born 1928), English dancer
 Russell Tully (1949–2013), Australian rules footballer
 Sean Tully, fictional character in Coronation Street
 Steve Tully (born 1980), English footballer
 Susan Tully (born 1968), English TV director, former actress in EastEnders
 Sydney Strickland Tully (1860–1911), Canadian academic painter
 Tanner Tully (born 1994), American baseball player
 Ted Tully (1930–2003), Canadian footballer
 Thomas Tully (1620–1676), English clergyman
 Tim Tully (born 1954), American neurobiologist
 Tom Tully (1908–1982), American actor
 Tom Tully (writer), British writer of Roy of the Rovers
 William Alcock Tully (1830–1905), Irish-born Surveyor-General of Queensland, Australia
 William J. Tully (1870–1930), New York politician

See also
 List of people with given name Tully

References

Tully
Tully